The Sussex Cricket League, founded in 1971, is the top level of competition for recreational club cricket in Sussex, England, and since 1999 the Premier Division has been a designated ECB Premier League. The League Headquarters is based in Hove, East Sussex. Following a review of club cricket in Sussex the league now has thirty five divisions, and no longer are there separate competitions for 2nd and lower XIs.

Champions

Championships won 
 

Source:

Premier Division performance by season from 1999

See also
 Cricket in Sussex

References

External links
 Sussex Cricket League – Play-Cricket site

English domestic cricket competitions
Cricket in East Sussex
Cricket in West Sussex
ECB Premier Leagues